Voyage to Cythera (translit. Taxidi sta Kythira) is a 1984 Greek film directed by Theodoros Angelopoulos. It was entered into the 1984 Cannes Film Festival, where it won the FIPRESCI Prize and the award for Best Screenplay.

Plot
A communist returns to Greece after decades of exile in the Soviet Union. He is disappointed by what he finds.

Cast
 Manos Katrakis as Spyros
 Mary Chronopoulou as Voula
 Dionysis Papagiannopoulos as Antonis
 Dora Volanaki as Katerina
 Giulio Brogi as Alexandros
 Giorgos Nezos as Panagiotis
 Athinodoros Prousalis as chief of police
 Michael Giannatos as police officer

Reception
Richard Bernstein of The New York Times was unfavorable toward the work; he stated that there were "extraordinary scenes", but argued that "when the end comes, the viewer is left [...] with the vague unsettled feeling that, aside from gaining the knowledge that exile is emptiness, two and a half hours in the presence of much onscreen joylessness has produced little satisfaction." Bernstein contended that Voyage to Cythera is "like a slightly too long allegory whose moral you just don't get." A reviewer for Time Out was mixed, writing, "The first half of the film [...] is suffused with that peculiar melancholy which Angelopoulos has made entirely his own. One begins to lose the thread in the second half, however, when the old man and his wife are cast adrift on a symbolic voyage to Cythera, birthplace of Aphrodite".

Other critics have praised the film. In the fifth edition of The New Biographical Dictionary of Film, David Thomson wrote that the "beauty of the film has seldom been equaled". In an article for the British Film Institute, Christina Newland included Voyage to Cythera in her list of 10 great Greek films. Matthew Thrift also lauded the trilogy of which the film is a part, writing that all three films "see Angelopoulos at the height of his creative powers". In the book A History of Greek Cinema, Vrasidas Karalis referred to Voyage to Cythera as one of the best films of its decade.

References

External links
 

1984 drama films
1984 films
Films directed by Theodoros Angelopoulos
Films scored by Eleni Karaindrou
1980s Greek-language films
Films set in Greece
Films with screenplays by Tonino Guerra
Greek drama films